Annobonae is Latin for "of the island of Annobón", it may refer to a number of species found on the island and in the surrounding waters:

Coptops annobonae, a species of beetle
Monochamus annobonae, a species of beetle
Pterolophia annobonae, a species of beetle
Thecacoris annobonae, synonym of Thecacoris trichogyne, a species of plant
Xylotrechus annobonae, a species of longhorn beetle

See also
Annobonensis (disambiguation)